Zbigniew Tulin (born 1 April 1976) is a Polish sprinter. He competed in the men's 4 × 100 metres relay at the 2004 Summer Olympics.

References

1976 births
Living people
Athletes (track and field) at the 2004 Summer Olympics
Polish male sprinters
Olympic athletes of Poland
Place of birth missing (living people)